Bab Galuiyeh (also Romanized as Bāb Galū’īyeh) is a village in Siyah Banuiyeh Rural District, in the Central District of Rabor County, Kerman Province, Iran. At the 2006 census, its population was 88, in 20 families.

References 

Populated places in Rabor County